Sushant Singh (born 1972) is an Indian actor.

Sushant Singh may also refer to:

 Sushant Singh Rajput (born 1986), Indian film and television actor
 Kunwar Sushant Singh (born 1988), Indian politician

See also 
 Sushant (disambiguation)